Mugoiri is a settlement in Kenya's Central Province. It's known to produce hardworking men and women who operates small and big businesses across Kenya.

References 

Populated places in Central Province (Kenya)